Defending champion Tímea Babos and her partner Kristina Mladenovic defeated Barbora Krejčíková and Kateřina Siniaková in the final, 6–4, 7–5 to win the doubles tennis title at the 2018 WTA Finals.

Babos and Andrea Sestini Hlaváčková were the reigning champions, but did not qualify together this year. Sestini Hlaváčková partnered Barbora Strýcová, but was defeated in the semifinals by Krejčíková and Siniaková.

Krejčiková and Siniaková secured the joint-year-end world No. 1 ranking by reaching the final. Babos and Mladenovic, alongside Strýcová, were also in contention for the year-end top ranking.

Seeds

Draw

Draw

References
Main Draw

2018 Doubles
Finals